Spintherobolus is a genus of characins that are endemic to river basins in southern and southeastern Brazil from Santa Catarina to Rio de Janeiro. All four species in the genus are considered threatened by Brazil's Ministry of the Environment.

Species
There are four currently recognized species:

 Spintherobolus ankoseion S. H. Weitzman & L. R. Malabarba, 1999
 Spintherobolus broccae G. S. Myers, 1925
 Spintherobolus leptoura S. H. Weitzman & L. R. Malabarba, 1999
 Spintherobolus papilliferus C. H. Eigenmann, 1911

References

Characidae
Fish of South America
Fish of Brazil
Endemic fauna of Brazil